Hartmut Schwabe (born 1 December 1943) is a German sprinter. He competed in the men's 4 × 400 metres relay at the 1968 Summer Olympics representing East Germany.

References

1943 births
Living people
Athletes (track and field) at the 1968 Summer Olympics
German male sprinters
Olympic athletes of East Germany
People from Strzelno
Sportspeople from Kuyavian-Pomeranian Voivodeship